Selinog, historically known as Silino and also named Silinog, is an island barangay in Dapitan, Zamboanga del Norte, Philippines. According to the 2010 census, the island community has a population of 712 inhabitants.

Majority of the island's inhabitants depend on fishing for subsistence and livelihood. Recently, salt-making, basket-weaving and marine tourism were also introduced as alternative sustainable livelihoods. As a barangay, the island has a health clinic, elementary school and barangay hall. 

With its white sand beaches and rich aquatic resources, Silinog was declared a marine reserve by the local government of Dapitan. In April 2000, the Philippine government through Proclamation No. 276 established the  Selinog Island Protected Landscape and Seascape covering the whole island and surrounding reefs to better manage its resources.

Demographics

See also
 List of islands of the Philippines

References

Islands of Zamboanga del Norte
Barangays of Zamboanga del Norte
Dapitan
Protected landscapes and seascapes of the Philippines